The Slavs were Christianized in waves from the 7th to 12th century, though the process of replacing old Slavic religious practices began as early as the 6th century. Generally speaking, the monarchs of the South Slavs adopted Christianity in the 9th century, the East Slavs in the 10th, and the West Slavs between the 9th and 12th century. Saints Cyril and Methodius ( 860–885) are attributed as "Apostles to the Slavs", having introduced the Byzantine-Slavic rite (Old Slavonic liturgy) and Glagolitic alphabet, the oldest known Slavic alphabet and basis for the Early Cyrillic alphabet. 

The simultaneous missionary efforts to convert the Slavs by what would later become known as the Catholic Church of Rome and the Eastern Orthodox Church of Constantinople led to a 'second point of contention between Rome and Constantinople', especially in Bulgaria (9th–10th century). This was one of many events that preceded the East–West Schism of 1054 and led to the eventual split between the Greek East and Latin West. The Slavs thus became divided between Eastern Orthodoxy and Roman Catholicism. Closely connected to the competing missionary efforts of the Roman Church and the Byzantine Church was the spread of the Latin and Cyrillic scripts in Eastern Europe. The majority of Orthodox Slavs adopted Cyrillic, while most Catholic Slavs adopted the Latin, but there were many exceptions to this general rule. In areas where both Churches were proselytising to pagan Europeans, such as the Grand Duchy of Lithuania, the Croatian Duchy and the Principality of Serbia, mixtures of languages, scripts and alphabets emerged, and the lines between Latin Catholic (Latinitas) and Cyrillic Orthodox literacy (Slavia Orthodoxa) were blurred.

Examples

Christianization of Bulgaria (864)
Christianization of Moravia (863)
Christianization of Serbs (accounted Christian as of about 870)
Christianization of Bohemia (884)
Christianization of Poland (966)
Christianization of Kievan Rus' (988)
Christianization of Pomerania (1124)

See also
 Outline of Slavic history and culture

References

Sources

 
 
 
 
 
 
 
 
 
 
 
 
 
 
 
 
 
 
 

Eastern Orthodox Christian culture
Christianization of Europe
Slavic history
Slavic culture